The men's qualification for football tournament at the 1987 All-Africa Games.

Qualification stage

Zone I (North Africa)
Libya and Morocco withdrew.

Algeria withdrew in protest of CAF's decision to order a replay of the first leg following Tunisia's protest that Algeria had fielded two professional players (Rabah Madjer and Chérif Oudjani).

CAF also rescinded an earlier decision to appoint Algeria as the replacement host of the 1988 African Cup of Nations finals (replacing original host Zambia), and awarded them to Morocco instead.

Tunisia qualified.

|}

Zone II (West Africa 1)
First round

|}

Second round

|}

Senegal qualified.

Zone III (West Africa 2)
First round

|}

Second round

|}

Third round

|}

Ivory Coast qualified.

Zone IV (Central Africa)
Qualifying tournament of Zone IV was combined with the 1987 Central African Games football tournament.

Cameroon qualified.

Zone V (East Africa)
Somalia withdrew.

First round

|}

Second round

|}

Egypt qualified; In addition, Kenya qualified as hosts.

Zone VI (Southern Africa)
First round

|}

Second round

|}

Third round

|}

Malawi qualified.

Zone VII (Indian Ocean)
First round

|}

Second round

|}

Madagascar qualified.

Qualifying teams
The following countries have qualified for the final tournament:

External links
African Games 1987 - Rec.Sport.Soccer Statistics Foundation

Qualification
1987